= Susan Watson (academic) =

New Zealand law academic

- Other name: Susan Mary Watson
- Education: University of Auckland
- Scientific career
- Fields: Company law
- Workplaces: University of Auckland

Susan Mary Watson is a New Zealand law academic specialising in company law. She is currently a full professor at the University of Auckland.

== Academic career ==
After an undergraduate at the University of Auckland, she practiced for two city law firms before joining the staff, rising to full professor.

Watson occasionally writes for the New Zealand Herald

== Selected works ==
- Watson, Susan, and Rebecca Hirsch. "The link between corporate governance and corruption in New Zealand." (2010).
- Vasudev, Palladam Madhavrao, and Susan Watson, eds. Corporate governance after the financial crisis. Edward Elgar Publishing, 2012.
- Farrar, John H., and Susan Watson. "Self-Dealing, Fair Dealing and Related Party Transactions—History, Policy and Reform." Journal of Corporate Law Studies 11, no. 2 (2011): 495–523.
- Watson, Susan. "The significance of the source of the powers of boards of directors in UK company law." (2010).
- Watson, Susan. "Liability of auditors to third parties in New Zealand, clarification at last." Journal of Business Law (2001): 52-52.
